Andrew Declan Griffin (born 9 January 1972) is a former English cricketer. Griffin played for Hertfordshire County Cricket Club as a wicket-keeper. He was born at Hammersmith in London in 1972.

Griffin made his debut for Hertfordshire against Cumberland in the 1993 Minor Counties Championship. He played Minor counties cricket for Hertfordshire from 1993 to 2000, making 48 Minor Counties Championship and eight MCCA Knockout Trophy appearances.  He made his List A cricket debut against the Leicestershire Cricket Board in the 1999 NatWest Trophy before going on to make a further three List A appearances for the county, the last of which came against Cambridgeshire in the 2000 NatWest Trophy.

References

External links

1972 births
Cricketers from Greater London
English cricketers
Hertfordshire cricketers
Living people
People from Hammersmith
Wicket-keepers